The 1808–09 United States House of Representatives elections were held on various dates in various states between April 26, 1808 and May 5, 1809. Each state set its own date for its elections to the House of Representatives before the first session of the 11th United States Congress convened on May 22, 1809. They coincided with James Madison being elected as president. Elections were held for all 142 seats, representing 17 states.

Despite Madison's victory, voters in districts whose economies were driven by shipping or manufacturing rather than agriculture shifted to the Federalist Party mainly due to the unpopularity of the Embargo Act of 1807 and fears that Democratic-Republican Party policies could trigger a naval war with France or Britain. The politically dominant Democratic-Republicans won their smallest majority since the pivotal, realigning election of 1800.

Election summaries

Special elections 

There were special elections in 1808 and 1809 during the 10th United States Congress and 11th United States Congress.

Elections are sorted here by date then district.

10th Congress 

|-
! 
| John Culpepper
|  | Federalist
| 1806
|  | Seat declared vacant January 2, 1808, due to a contest on account of alleged irregularities.Incumbent re-elected February 1, 1808.Democratic-Republican hold.Incumbent re-seated February 23, 1808.Incumbent later lost re-election, see below.
| nowrap | 

|-
! 
| Ezra Darby
|  | Democratic-Republican
| 1804
|  | Incumbent died January 27, 1808.New member elected March 8–9, 1808.Democratic-Republican hold.Successor seated April 1, 1808.Successor later elected to the next term, see below.
| nowrap | 

|-
! 
| David Thomas
|  | Democratic-Republican
| 1800
|  | Incumbent resigned February 5, 1808, to become New York State Treasurer..New member elected April 26–28, 1808.Democratic-Republican hold.Successor seated November 7, 1808.Successor lost election the same day to the next term in the redistricted , see below.
| nowrap | 

|-
! 
| Jacob Crowninshield
|  | Democratic-Republican
| 1802
|  | Incumbent died April 15, 1808.New member elected May 4, 1808.Democratic-Republican hold.Successor seated December 20, 1808.Successor later retired instead of running for the next term, see below.
| nowrap | 

|-
! 
| Nehemiah Knight
|  | Democratic-Republican
| 1802
|  | Incumbent died June 13, 1808.New member elected August 30, 1808.Federalist gain.Successor seated November 11, 1808.Successor also elected the same day to the next term, see below.
| nowrap | 

|-
! 
| James Witherell
|  | Democratic-Republican
| 1806
|  | Incumbent resigned May 1, 1808, to become judge of the Supreme Court of Michigan Territory.New member elected September 6, 1808.Democratic-Republican hold.Successor seated November 8, 1808.Successor also elected the same day to the next term, see below.
| nowrap | 

|-
! 
| John Claiborne
|  | Democratic-Republican
| 1805
|  | Incumbent died October 9, 1808.New member elected September 8, 1808.Democratic-Republican hold.Successor seated November 7, 1808.Successor later elected to the next term, see below.
| nowrap | 

|-
! 
| Benjamin Parke
|  | Federalist
| 1805
|  | Incumbent resigned March 1, 1808.New delegate elected October 22, 1808.Democratic-Republican gain.
| nowrap | 

|-
! 
| Joseph Clay
|  | Democratic-Republican
| 1802
|  | Incumbent resigned March 28, 1808.New member elected October 11, 1808.Democratic-Republican hold.Successor seated November 16, 1808.Successor elected the same day to the next term, see below.
| nowrap | 

|}

11th Congress 

|-
! 
| Benjamin Say
|  | Democratic-Republican
| 1808 
|  | Incumbent resigned June 1809.New member elected October 10, 1809.Democratic-Republican hold.Successor seated November 27, 1809.
| nowrap | 

|-
! 
| Wilson C. Nicholas
|  | Democratic-Republican
| 1807
|  | Incumbent resigned November 27, 1809.New member elected December 1809.Democratic-Republican hold.Successor seated January 17, 1810.
| nowrap | 

|}

Connecticut 

|-
! rowspan=7 | 
| Epaphroditus Champion
|  | Federalist
| 1806
| Incumbent re-elected.
| rowspan=7 nowrap | :

|-
| Samuel W. Dana
|  | Federalist
| 1796 
| Incumbent re-elected.

|-
| John Davenport
|  | Federalist
| 1798
| Incumbent re-elected.

|-
| Jonathan O. Moseley
|  | Federalist
| 1804
| Incumbent re-elected.

|-
| Timothy Pitkin
|  | Federalist
| 1805 
| Incumbent re-elected.

|-
| Lewis B. Sturges
|  | Federalist
| 1805 
| Incumbent re-elected.

|-
| Benjamin Tallmadge
|  | Federalist
| 1801 
| Incumbent re-elected.

|}

Delaware 

|-
! 
| Nicholas Van Dyke
|  | Federalist
| 1807 
|  | Incumbent retired.New member elected.Federalist hold.
| nowrap | 

|}

Georgia 

|-
! rowspan=4 | 
| William W. Bibb
|  | Democratic-Republican
| 1806
| Incumbent re-elected.
| rowspan=4 nowrap | :

|-
| George M. Troup
|  | Democratic-Republican
| 1806
| Incumbent re-elected.

|-
| Howell Cobb
|  | Democratic-Republican
| 1806
| Incumbent re-elected.

|-
| Dennis Smelt
|  | Democratic-Republican
| 1806 
| Incumbent re-elected.

|}

Indiana Territory 
See Non-voting delegates, below.

Kentucky 

|-
! 
| Matthew Lyon
|  | Democratic-Republican
| 1797 1803
| Incumbent re-elected.
| nowrap | 

|-
! 
| John Boyle
|  | Democratic-Republican
| 1803
|  | Incumbent retired.New member elected.Democratic-Republican hold.
| nowrap | 

|-
! 
| John Rowan
|  | Democratic-Republican
| 1806
|  | Incumbent retired.New member elected.Democratic-Republican hold.
| nowrap | 

|-
! 
| Richard M. Johnson
|  | Democratic-Republican
| 1806
| Incumbent re-elected.
| nowrap | 

|-
! 
| Benjamin Howard
|  | Democratic-Republican
| 1806
| Incumbent re-elected.
| nowrap | 

|-
! 
| Joseph Desha
|  | Democratic-Republican
| 1806
| Incumbent re-elected.
| nowrap | 

|}

Maryland 

|-
! 
| John Campbell
|  | Federalist
| 1801
| Incumbent re-elected.
| nowrap | 

|-
! 
| Archibald Van Horne
|  | Democratic-Republican
| 1806
| Incumbent re-elected.
| nowrap | 

|-
! 
| Philip Barton Key
|  | Federalist
| 1806
| Incumbent re-elected.
| nowrap | 

|-
! 
| Roger Nelson
|  | Democratic-Republican
| 1804 
| Incumbent re-elected.
| nowrap | 

|-
! rowspan=2 | 
| Nicholas R. Moore
|  | Democratic-Republican
| 1803
| Incumbent re-elected.
| rowspan=2 nowrap | 

|-
| William McCreery
|  | Democratic-Republican
| 1803
|  | Incumbent retired.New member elected.Democratic-Republican hold.

|-
! 
| John Montgomery
|  | Democratic-Republican
| 1806
| Incumbent re-elected.
| nowrap | 

|-
! 
| Edward Lloyd
|  | Democratic-Republican
| 1806
|  | Incumbent retired.New member elected.Democratic-Republican hold.
| nowrap | 

|-
! 
| Charles Goldsborough
|  | Federalist
| 1804
| Incumbent re-elected.
| nowrap | 

|}

Massachusetts 

|-
! 
| Josiah Quincy
|  | Federalist
| 1804
| Incumbent re-elected.
| nowrap | 

|-
! 
| Joseph Story
|  | Democratic-Republican
| 1808 
|  | Incumbent retired.New member elected.Federalist gain.
| nowrap | 

|-
! 
| Edward St. Loe Livermore
|  | Federalist
| 1806
| Incumbent re-elected.
| nowrap | 

|-
! 
| Joseph Bradley Varnum
|  | Democratic-Republican
| 1794
| Incumbent re-elected.
| nowrap | 

|-
! 
| William Ely
|  | Federalist
| 1804
| Incumbent re-elected.
| nowrap | 

|-
! 
| Samuel Taggart
|  | Federalist
| 1803
| Incumbent re-elected.
| nowrap | 

|-
! 
| Joseph Barker
|  | Democratic-Republican
| 1804
|  | Incumbent retired.Two ballots were held, but the second was invalidated.New member elected.Democratic-Republican hold.
| nowrap | 

|-
! 
| Isaiah L. Green
|  | Democratic-Republican
| 1804
|  | Incumbent retired.New member elected.Democratic-Republican hold.
| nowrap | 

|-
! 
| Josiah Dean
|  | Democratic-Republican
| 1806
|  | Lost re-electionFederalist gain.
| nowrap | 

|-
! 
| Jabez Upham
|  | Federalist
| 1806
| Incumbent re-elected.
| nowrap | 

|-
! 
| William Stedman
|  | Federalist
| 1803
| Incumbent re-elected.
| nowrap | 

|-
! 
| Ezekiel Bacon
|  | Democratic-Republican
| 1807 
| Incumbent re-elected.
| nowrap | 

|-
! 
| Ebenezer Seaver
|  | Democratic-Republican
| 1803
| Incumbent re-elected.
| nowrap | 

|-
! 
| Richard Cutts
|  | Democratic-Republican
| 1801
| Incumbent re-elected.
| nowrap | 

|-
! 
| Daniel Ilsley
|  | Democratic-Republican
| 1804
|  | Lost re-electionFederalist gain.
| nowrap | 

|-
! 
| Orchard Cook
|  | Democratic-Republican
| 1804
| Incumbent re-elected.
| nowrap | 

|-
! 
| John Chandler
|  | Democratic-Republican
| 1804
|  | Incumbent retired.New member elected.Democratic-Republican hold.
| nowrap | 

|}

Mississippi Territory 
See Non-voting delegates, below.

New Hampshire 

|-
! rowspan=5 | 
| Peter Carleton
|  | Democratic-Republican
| 1806
|  | Incumbent retired.New member elected.Federalist gain.
| nowrap rowspan=5 | :

|-
| Daniel M. Durell
|  | Democratic-Republican
| 1806
|  | Lost re-election.New member elected.Federalist gain.

|-
| Francis Gardner
|  | Democratic-Republican
| 1806
|  | Lost re-election.New member elected.Federalist gain.

|-
| Jedediah K. Smith
|  | Democratic-Republican
| 1806
|  | Lost re-election.New member elected.Federalist gain.

|-
| Clement Storer
|  | Democratic-Republican
| 1806
|  | Lost re-election.New member elected.Federalist gain.

|}

New Jersey 

|-
! rowspan=6 | 
| Adam Boyd
|  | Democratic-Republican
| 1808 
| Incumbent re-elected.
| rowspan=6 nowrap | :

|-
| Thomas Newbold
|  | Democratic-Republican
| 1806
| Incumbent re-elected.

|-
| William Helms
|  | Democratic-Republican
| 1800
| Incumbent re-elected.

|-
| John Lambert
|  | Democratic-Republican
| 1804
|  | Incumbent retired.New member elected.Democratic-Republican hold.

|-
| Henry Southard
|  | Democratic-Republican
| 1800
| Incumbent re-elected.

|-
| James Sloan
|  | Democratic-Republican
| 1803
|  | Incumbent retired.New member elected.Democratic-Republican hold.

|}

New York 

Between the 1806 and 1808 elections, New York went through a redistricting that reduced the number of districts to 15 by creating two plural districts with two seats each. This brought the state's 17-seat delegation from a 15-2 ratio favoring Democratic-Republicans to a nearly-even 9-8 split in their favor.

|-
! 
| Samuel Riker
|  | Democratic-Republican
| 1806
|  | Incumbent retired.New member elected.Democratic-Republican hold.
| nowrap | 

|-
! rowspan=2 | 
| Gurdon S. Mumford
|  | Democratic-Republican
| 1804 
| Incumbent re-elected but declined the seat.
| rowspan=2  nowrap | 

|-
| George Clinton Jr.
|  | Democratic-Republican
| 1805 
|  | Incumbent retired.New member elected.Democratic-Republican hold.

|-
! rowspan=2 | 
| John Blake Jr.
|  | Democratic-Republican
| 1804
|  | Incumbent retired.New member elected.Democratic-Republican hold.
| rowspan=2 nowrap | 
|-
| Philip Van Cortlandt
|  | Democratic-Republican
| 1793
|  | Incumbent retired.Democratic-Republican loss.

|-
! 
| Daniel C. Verplanck 
|  | Democratic-Republican
| 1803 
|  | Incumbent retired.New member elected.Federalist gain.
| nowrap | 

|-
! 
| Barent Gardenier
|  | Federalist
| 1806
| Incumbent re-elected.
| nowrap | 

|-
! rowspan=3 | 
| James I. Van Alen
|  | Democratic-Republican
| 1806
|  | Incumbent lost re-election.New member elected.Federalist gain.
| rowspan=3 nowrap | 

|-
| Josiah Masters
|  | Democratic-Republican
| 1804
|  | Incumbent retired.New member elected.Federalist gain.

|-
| Nathan Wilson
|  | Democratic-Republican
| 1808
|  | Incumbent retired.New member elected.Democratic-Republican loss.

|-
! 
| Killian Van Rensselaer
|  | Federalist
| 1800
| Incumbent re-elected.
| nowrap | 

|-
! 
| John Thompson
|  | Democratic-Republican
| 1806
| Incumbent re-elected.
| nowrap | 

|-
! 
| Peter Swart
|  | Democratic-Republican
| 1806
|  | Incumbent retired.New member elected.Federalist gain.
| nowrap | 

|-
! 
| colspan=3 | None (District created)
|  | New seat.New member elected.Democratic-Republican gain.
| nowrap | 

|-
! 
| colspan=3 | None (District created)
|  | New seat.New member elected.Federalist gain.
| nowrap | 

|-
! 
| John Russell
|  | Democratic-Republican
| 1806
|  | Incumbent retired.New member elected.Democratic-Republican hold.
| nowrap | 

|-
! rowspan=2 | 
| William Kirkpatrick
|  | Democratic-Republican
| 1806
|  | Incumbent retired.New member elected.Democratic-Republican hold.
| rowspan=2 nowrap | 
|-
| Reuben Humphrey
|  | Democratic-Republican
| 1806
|  | Incumbent retired.Democratic-Republican loss.

|-
! 
| John Harris
|  | Democratic-Republican
| 1806
|  | Incumbent lost re-election.New member elected.Federalist gain.
| nowrap | 

|-
! 
| colspan=3 | None (District created)
|  | New seat.New member elected.Democratic-Republican gain.
| nowrap | 

|}

North Carolina 

|-
! 
| Lemuel Sawyer
|  | Democratic-Republican
| 1806
| Incumbent re-elected.
| nowrap | 

|-
! 
| Willis Alston
|  | Democratic-Republican
| 1798
| Incumbent re-elected.
| nowrap | 

|-
! 
| Thomas Blount
|  | Democratic-Republican
| 17931802 1804
|  | Incumbent lost re-election.New member elected.Democratic-Republican hold.
| nowrap | 

|-
! 
| William Blackledge
|  | Democratic-Republican
| 1803
|  | Incumbent lost re-election.New member elected.Federalist gain.
| nowrap | 

|-
! 
| Thomas Kenan
|  | Democratic-Republican
| 1805 
| Incumbent re-elected.
| nowrap | 

|-
! 
| Nathaniel Macon
|  | Democratic-Republican
| 1791
| Incumbent re-elected.
| nowrap | 

|-
! 
| John Culpepper
|  | Federalist
| 18061808 1808 
|  | Incumbent lost re-election.New member elected.Federalist hold.
| nowrap | 

|-
! 
| Richard Stanford
|  | Democratic-Republican
| 1796
| Incumbent re-elected.
| nowrap | 

|-
! 
| Marmaduke Williams
|  | Democratic-Republican
| 1803
|  | Incumbent retired.New member elected.Democratic-Republican hold.
| nowrap | 

|-
! 
| Evan S. Alexander
|  | Democratic-Republican
| 1806 
|  | Incumbent retired.New member elected.Federalist gain.
| nowrap | 

|-
! 
| James Holland
|  | Democratic-Republican
| 1800
| Incumbent re-elected.
| nowrap | 

|-
! 
| Meshack Franklin
|  | Democratic-Republican
| 1806
| Incumbent re-elected.
| nowrap | 

|}

Ohio 

|-
! 
| Jeremiah Morrow
|  | Democratic-Republican
| 1803
| Incumbent re-elected.
| nowrap | 

|}

Orleans Territory 
See Non-voting delegates, below.

Pennsylvania 

|-
! rowspan=3 | 
| Benjamin Say
|  | Democratic-Republican
| 1808 
| Incumbent re-elected.
| rowspan=3 nowrap | 

|-
| John Porter
|  | Democratic-Republican
| 1806
| Incumbent re-elected.

|-
| Jacob Richards
|  | Democratic-Republican
| 1802
|  | Incumbent retired.New member elected.Democratic-Republican hold.

|-
! rowspan=3 | 
| Robert Brown
|  | Democratic-Republican
| 1798 
| Incumbent re-elected.
| rowspan=3 nowrap | 

|-
| John Pugh
|  | Democratic-Republican
| 1804
|  | Lost re-electionDemocratic-Republican hold.

|-
| William Milnor
|  | Federalist
| 1806
| Incumbent re-elected.

|-
! rowspan=3 | 
| Matthias Richards
|  | Democratic-Republican
| 1806
| Incumbent re-elected.
| rowspan=3 nowrap | 

|-
| John Hiester
|  | Democratic-Republican
| 1806
|  | Incumbent retired.New member elected.Democratic-Republican hold.

|-
| Robert Jenkins
|  | Federalist
| 1806
| Incumbent re-elected.

|-
! rowspan=2 | 
| Robert Whitehill
|  | Democratic-Republican
| 1805 
| Incumbent re-elected.
| rowspan=2 nowrap | 

|-
| David Bard
|  | Democratic-Republican
| 1802
| Incumbent re-elected.

|-
! 
| Daniel Montgomery
|  | Democratic-Republican
| 1806
|  | Incumbent retired.New member elected.Democratic-Republican hold.
| nowrap | 

|-
! 
| James Kelly
|  | Federalist
| 1804
|  | Incumbent lost re-election.New member elected.Democratic-Republican gain.
| nowrap | 

|-
! 
| John Rea
|  | Democratic-Republican
| 1802
| Incumbent re-elected.
| nowrap | 

|-
! 
| William Findley
|  | Democratic-Republican
| 1802
| Incumbent re-elected.
| nowrap | 

|-
! 
| John Smilie
|  | Democratic-Republican
| 17921794 1798
| Incumbent re-elected.
| nowrap | 

|-
! 
| William Hoge
|  | Democratic-Republican
| 1806
|  | Incumbent retired.New member elected.Democratic-Republican hold.
| nowrap | 

|-
! 
| Samuel Smith
|  | Democratic-Republican
| 1805 
| Incumbent re-elected.
| nowrap | 

|}

Rhode Island 

|-
! rowspan=2 | 
| Nehemiah Knight
|  | Democratic-Republican
| 1802
|  | Incumbent died June 13, 1808.New member elected.Federalist gain.Successor (Jackson) also elected the same day to finish the term, see above.
| rowspan=2 nowrap | :

|-
| Isaac Wilbour
|  | Democratic-Republican
| 1806
|  | Incumbent lost re-election.New member elected.Federalist gain.

|}

South Carolina 

|-
! 
| Robert Marion
|  | Democratic-Republican
| 1804
| Incumbent re-elected.
| nowrap | 

|-
! 
| William Butler Sr.
|  | Democratic-Republican
| 1800
| Incumbent re-elected.
| nowrap | 

|-
! 
| David R. Williams
|  | Democratic-Republican
| 1804
|  | Incumbent retired.New member elected.Democratic-Republican hold.
| nowrap | 

|-
! 
| John Taylor
|  | Democratic-Republican
| 1806
| Incumbent re-elected.
| nowrap | 

|-
! 
| Richard Winn
|  | Democratic-Republican
| 1802 
| Incumbent re-elected.
| nowrap | 

|-
! 
| Joseph Calhoun
|  | Democratic-Republican
| 1807 
| Incumbent re-elected.
| nowrap | 

|-
! 
| Thomas Moore
|  | Democratic-Republican
| 1800
| Incumbent re-elected.
| nowrap | 

|-
! 
| Lemuel J. Alston
|  | Democratic-Republican
| 1806
| Incumbent re-elected.
| nowrap | 

|}

Tennessee 

|-
! 
| John Rhea
|  | Democratic-Republican
| 1803
| Incumbent re-elected.
| nowrap | 

|-
! 
| George W. Campbell
|  | Democratic-Republican
| 1803
|  | Incumbent retired.New member elected.Democratic-Republican hold.
| nowrap | 

|-
! 
| Jesse Wharton
|  | Democratic-Republican
| 1807
|  | Incumbent retired.New member elected.Democratic-Republican hold.
| nowrap | 

|}

Vermont 

|-
! 
| James Witherell
|  | Democratic-Republican
| 1806
|  | Incumbent resigned May 1, 1808.New member elected.Democratic-Republican hold.Successor was also elected the same day to finish the current term, see above.
| nowrap | 

|-
! 
| James Elliot
|  | Federalist
| 1802
|  | Incumbent retired.New member elected.Federalist hold.
| First ballot :Jonathan H. Hubbard (Federalist) 45.4%Aaron Leland (Democratic-Republican) 36.2%William Czar Bradley (Democratic-Republican) 14.5%Others 4.0%Second ballot :nowrap | 

|-
! 
| James Fisk
|  | Democratic-Republican
| 1802
|  | Lost re-election.New member elected.Federalist gain.
| First ballot :Jedediah Buckingham (Federalist) 47.9%James Fisk (Democratic-Republican) 47.4%William Chamberlain (Federalist) 2.3%Others 2.3%Second ballot :nowrap | 

|-
! 
| Martin Chittenden
|  | Federalist
| 1802
| Incumbent re-elected.
| nowrap | 

|}

Virginia 

|-
! 
| John G. Jackson
|  | Democratic-Republican
| 1803
| Incumbent re-elected.
| nowrap | 

|-
! 
| John Morrow
|  | Democratic-Republican
| 1805
|  | Incumbent lost re-election.New member elected.Federalist gain.
| nowrap | 

|-
! 
| John Smith
|  | Democratic-Republican
| 1801
| Incumbent re-elected.
| nowrap | 

|-
! 
| David Holmes
|  | Democratic-Republican
| 1797
|  | Incumbent retired.New member elected.Federalist gain.
| nowrap | 

|-
! 
| Alexander Wilson
|  | Democratic-Republican
| 1804 
|  | Incumbent lost re-election.New member elected.Federalist gain.
| nowrap | 

|-
! 
| Abram Trigg
|  | Democratic-Republican
| 1797
|  | Incumbent retired.New member elected.Federalist gain.
| nowrap | 

|-
! 
| Joseph Lewis Jr.
|  | Federalist
| 1803
| Incumbent re-elected.
| nowrap | 

|-
! 
| Walter Jones
|  | Democratic-Republican
| 1803
| Incumbent re-elected.
| nowrap | 

|-
! 
| John Love
|  | Democratic-Republican
| 1807
| Incumbent re-elected.
| nowrap | 

|-
! 
| John Dawson
|  | Democratic-Republican
| 1797
| Incumbent re-elected.
| nowrap | 

|-
! 
| James M. Garnett
|  | Democratic-Republican
| 1805
|  | Incumbent retired.New member elected.Democratic-Republican hold.
| nowrap | 

|-
! 
| Burwell Bassett
|  | Democratic-Republican
| 1805
| Incumbent re-elected.
| nowrap | 

|-
! 
| William A. Burwell
|  | Democratic-Republican
| 1806 
| Incumbent re-elected.
| nowrap | 

|-
! 
| Matthew Clay
|  | Democratic-Republican
| 1797
| Incumbent re-elected.
| nowrap | 

|-
! 
| John Randolph
|  | Democratic-Republican
| 1799
| Incumbent re-elected.
| nowrap | 

|-
! 
| John W. Eppes
|  | Democratic-Republican
| 1803
| Incumbent re-elected.
| nowrap | 

|-
! 
| Thomas Gholson Jr.
|  | Democratic-Republican
| 1808 
| Incumbent re-elected.
| nowrap | 

|-
! 
| Peterson Goodwyn
|  | Democratic-Republican
| 1803
| Incumbent re-elected.
| nowrap | 

|-
! 
| Edwin Gray
|  | Democratic-Republican
| 1799
| Incumbent re-elected.
| nowrap | 

|-
! 
| Thomas Newton Jr.
|  | Democratic-Republican
| 1799
| Incumbent re-elected.
| nowrap | 

|-
! 
| Wilson C. Nicholas
|  | Democratic-Republican
| 1807
| Incumbent re-elected.
| nowrap | 

|-
! 
| John Clopton
|  | Democratic-Republican
| 1801
| Incumbent re-elected.
| nowrap | 

|}

Non-voting delegates 

Three territories sent non-voting delegates to the 11th Congress.

Indiana Territory elected by popular vote for the first time.  Mississippi Territory also elected its delegate by popular vote.  Orleans Territory retained legislative election of its delegate.

|-
! 
| Jesse B. Thomas
|  | Democratic-Republican
| 1808 
|  | New member elected November 27, 1809.Democratic-Republican hold.Election was unsuccessfully challenged.
| nowrap | 

|-
! 
| George Poindexter
|  | Democratic-Republican
| 1806
| Incumbent re-elected.
| nowrap | 

|-
! 
| Daniel Clark
|  | None
| 1806
| Incumbent lost renomination.New member of an unknown party elected in 1808.
| nowrap | 

|}

See also 
 1808 United States elections
 List of United States House of Representatives elections (1789–1822)
 1808–09 United States Senate elections
 1808 United States presidential election
 10th United States Congress
 11th United States Congress

Notes

References

Bibliography

External links 
 Office of the Historian (Office of Art & Archives, Office of the Clerk, U.S. House of Representatives)